Hollis John "Sloppy" Thurston (June 2, 1899 – September 14, 1973) was an American professional baseball pitcher. He played in Major League Baseball (MLB) for the St. Louis Browns, Chicago White Sox, Washington Senators, and Brooklyn Robins/Dodgers between 1923 and 1933. He batted and threw right-handed.

Biography
Thurston was born in Fremont, Nebraska, and graduated from John H. Francis Polytechnic High School.

Thurston was a screwball pitcher. He played professional baseball from 1920 to 1938, spending time in the minor leagues when not in the majors. He played his first MLB game on April 19, 1923, with the St. Louis Browns.

On August 22, 1923, Thurston became the fifth pitcher in major-league history to pitch an immaculate inning, striking out all three batters on nine total pitches in the 12th inning of a game against the Philadelphia Athletics; he was also the first pitcher to achieve the feat in extra innings.

In 1924, while pitching for the Chicago White Sox, Thurston led the American League with 28 complete games, posting a 20–14 record in 36 starts, while also leading the league in hits allowed (330), earned runs allowed (123), and home runs allowed (17) in 291 innings pitched.

Thurston played his last MLB game on October 1, 1933. He finished his nine-year MLB career with a win–loss record of 89–86, a 4.24 earned run average, and 306 strikeouts. As a hitter, he posted a .270 batting average (175-for-648) with 5 home runs and 79 runs batted in.

Thurston died on September 14, 1973, in Los Angeles, California. He is interred at Holy Cross Cemetery in Culver City, California.

References

External links

 Baseball Almanac: Sloppy Thurston stats
 

1899 births
1973 deaths
Major League Baseball pitchers
Baseball players from Nebraska
Brooklyn Dodgers players
Brooklyn Robins players
Burials at Holy Cross Cemetery, Culver City
Chicago White Sox players
Chicago White Sox scouts
Cleveland Indians scouts
John H. Francis Polytechnic High School alumni
Minor league baseball managers
Mission Reds players
Oakland Oaks (baseball) players
People from Fremont, Nebraska
Pittsburgh Pirates scouts
Salt Lake City Bees players
San Francisco Seals (baseball) players
Screwball pitchers
Seattle Indians players
St. Louis Browns players
Tacoma Tigers players
Washington Senators (1901–1960) players